Located in Lancaster County, Virginia, the Corrotoman River is a tributary of the Rappahannock River, flowing into the Chesapeake Bay. Along with its sister waterways, the Corrotoman River has important cultural and historical significance in the region due to pre-colonization indigenous communities, notably the Powhatan peoples. The Corrotoman River used to be a popular place to get seed oysters, but a disease has cut oyster production in this area by a lot.

Description

Main Body
The mouth of the Corrotoman River is between Towle Point and Orchard Point. Whitehouse Creek, as well as Ewells Prong and Millenbeck Prong, are located on the western side of the river. Farther north and inland, Corrotoman Point sits on the eastern shore of the river, and Ball Point is located on the western shore of the river. The river narrows significantly at this point.

On the western side of the river, after Ball Point, Yankee Point marks the beginning of Myers Creek.  Myers Creek is home to the only marina on the river, the Yankee Point Marina. North of Yankee Point is Bar Point, where the Western Branch starts.

On the eastern side of the river, after Corrotoman Point, is Taylor Creek and Moran Creek. North of those is Moran Wharf, which signifies the start of the Eastern Branch.

Western Branch
The Western Branch starts between [[Bar Point]] and West Point, which point northwest. The Merry Point cable ferry is located near the start of the branch that runs between Ottoman Wharf and Merry Point.  In the order they are encountered heading up the branch, the creeks are John Creek, Lowrey Creek, Senior Creek, and Davis Creek. From there, the branch forks into two, the eastern fork ending at Belwood Swamp, approximately one mile west of Lancaster Courthouse, and the western fork, Little Branch, ending at Griffins Landing.

Eastern Branch
The Eastern Branch starts between West Point and Moran Wharf, and points in a northeast direction. The branch splits off into Camps Prong and Norris Prong, which lead to Camps Millpond and Norris Pond, respectively.

See also
List of rivers of Virginia
Powhatan
Pocahontas
Algonquian peoples

References 

Rivers of Virginia
Tributaries of the Rappahannock River